Dave Drechsler (born July 18, 1960) is a former guard in the National Football League. In the 1983 NFL Draft, Drechsler was drafted in the second round by the Green Bay Packers and played two seasons with the team. He played at the collegiate level at the University of North Carolina at Chapel Hill.

Drechsler played a total of 32 games over two seasons, all with the Green Bay Packers. In his rookie season, he started 12 games for the Packers, all at the Left Guard position. After the 1984 season, he entered the business world, working at Huffman Technologies from 1985 - 2010, eventually serving as the VP and COO.

See also
List of Green Bay Packers players

References

1960 births
Green Bay Packers players
American football offensive guards
University of North Carolina at Chapel Hill alumni
North Carolina Tar Heels football players
Living people